Prisoners of Love: A Smattering of Scintillating Senescent Songs: 1985–2003 is a best-of compilation album of songs by the band Yo La Tengo. It was available in two- or three-disc editions, the third disc being A Smattering of Outtakes and Rarities 1986–2002.

The front and rear cover art is reminiscent of The Beatles' Second Album in style, color and layout of band photographs.

Track listing
Disc one
"Shaker" (from the Shaker EP, 1993) - 3:20
"Sugarcube" (from I Can Hear the Heart Beating as One, 1997) - 3:22
"Barnaby, Hardly Working" (from President Yo La Tengo, 1989) - 4:36
"Little Eyes" (from Summer Sun, 2003) - 4:22
"Stockholm Syndrome" (from I Can Hear the Heart Beating as One, 1997) - 2:53
"Our Way to Fall" (from And Then Nothing Turned Itself Inside-Out, 2000) - 4:20
"From a Motel 6" (from Painful, 1993) - 4:11
"Swing For Life" (from May I Sing With Me, 1992) - 5:16
"Tom Courtenay" (from Electr-O-Pura, 1995) - 3:32
"Lewis" (from New Wave Hot Dogs, 1987) - 2:30
"I Heard You Looking" (from Painful, 1993) - 7:02
"You Can Have It All" (from And Then Nothing Turned Itself Inside-Out, 2000) - 4:37
"Did I Tell You" (from Fakebook, 1990) - 3:28

Disc two
"The River of Water" (from The River of Water/A House Is Not a Motel - 7", 1985) - 2:31
"Autumn Sweater" (from I Can Hear the Heart Beating as One, 1997) - 5:19
"Big Day Coming" (from Painful, 1993) - 4:14
"Pablo and Andrea" (from Electr-O-Pura, 1995) - 4:17
"Drug Test" (from President Yo La Tengo, 1989) - 4:08
"Season of the Shark" (from Summer Sun, 2003) - 4:29
"Upside-Down" (from May I Sing With Me, 1992) - 2:41
"The Summer" (from Fakebook, 1990) - 2:39
"Tears Are in Your Eyes" (from And Then Nothing Turned Itself Inside-Out, 2000) - 4:35
"Blue Line Swinger" (from Electr-O-Pura, 1995) - 9:30
"The Story of Jazz" (from New Wave Hot Dogs, 1987) - 3:35
"Nuclear War" (version 1) (from the Nuclear War EP, 2002) - 7:35
"By the Time It Gets Dark" (Sandy Denny cover from the Little Honda EP, 1997) - 3:02

A Smattering of Outtakes and Rarities 1986–2002
As indicated by its title, these songs are outtakes and rarities. Some tracks were previously released as indicated.
"Stay Away From Heaven" - the film The Invisible Circus - 4:31
"Pencil Test"* - I Can Hear the Heart Beating as One session track - 3:39
"Almost True"* - And Then Nothing Turned Itself Inside-Out session track - 3:05
"Tom Courtenay" (acoustic version) - Camp Yo La Tengo - EP - 3:13
"Big Day Coming" (demo)* - 3:43
"Dreaming" (The Cosmic Rays cover) - 3:37
"Bad Politics" - Tom Courtenay single - 2:59
"Blue-Green Arrow" - from Earworm 7" - 5:42
"Decora" (acoustic)* - KCRW Morning Becomes Eclectic session, circa '95 - 3:06
"Out the Window" (original version) - That is Yo La Tengo - EP 4:16
"Weather Shy" from the film The Invisible Circus - 4:54
"Dreams" (Fleetwood Mac cover) - Chemical Imbalance cover mount 7" - 4:47
"Autumn Sweater" (Kevin Shields remix) - Autumn Sweater EP - 8:42
"Ashes on the Ground" - From A Motel 6 EP - 5:15
"Mr. Ameche Plays the Stranger" - Camp Yo La Tengo EP - 9:19
"Magnet" - the NRBQ tribute album The Q People 4:10

References

2006 greatest hits albums
Yo La Tengo albums